Sinbad the Seasick (Spanish:Simbad el mareado) is a 1950 Mexican comedy film directed by Gilberto Martínez Solares and starring Germán Valdés, Marcelo Chávez and Famie Kaufman.

Main cast
 Germán Valdés as Simbad  
 Marcelo Chávez as Marcelo  
 Famie Kaufman as La flaca  
 Jacqueline Evans as Genevieve / Mary Smith  
 Juan García as Juan el policía  
 Jorge Reyes as Detective  
 Wolf Ruvinskis as Hampón, novio de Mary  
 Guillermina Téllez Girón as Amiga de la flaca  
 Lupe Llaca as Amiga de la flaca 
 José René Ruiz as Hampón bajito  
 Telma Ferriño as Azucena

References

Bibliography 
 Rogelio Agrasánchez. Cine Mexicano: Posters from the Golden Age, 1936-1956. Chronicle Books, 2001.

External links 
 

1950 films
1950 comedy films
Mexican comedy films
1950s Spanish-language films
Films directed by Gilberto Martínez Solares
Mexican black-and-white films
1950s Mexican films